Behind Your Back is a 1937 British drama film directed by Donovan Pedelty and starring Jack Livesey, Dinah Sheridan and Betty Astell. It was made at Wembley Studios as a quota quickie.

Cast
 Jack Livesey as Archie Bentley  
 Dinah Sheridan as Kitty Hogan  
 Betty Astell as Gwen Bingham  
 Stella Bonheur as Lady Millicent Coombe  
 Desmond Marshall as Leslie Woodford  
 Rani Waller as Mary Woodford  
 Kenneth Buckley as Albert Clifford  
 Toni Edgar-Bruce as Clara Bradley  
 Raymond Lovell as Adam Adams  
 Jimmy Mageean as Man from the Stalls  
 Molly Hamley-Clifford as Mrs. Cowell  
 Jonathan Field as Vivian Hooker  
 Dorothy Dewhurst as Hon. Mrs. Vealfield

References

Bibliography
 Chibnall, Steve. Quota Quickies: The Birth of the British 'B' Film. British Film Institute, 2007.
 Low, Rachael. Filmmaking in 1930s Britain. George Allen & Unwin, 1985.
 Wood, Linda. British Films, 1927-1939. British Film Institute, 1986.

External links

1937 films
British drama films
1937 drama films
Films directed by Donovan Pedelty
Quota quickies
Films shot at Wembley Studios
British black-and-white films
1930s English-language films
1930s British films